= Kyee Myint Saw =

Burmese painter

Kyee Myint Saw ကြီးမြင့်စော
- Born: 1939; Yangon, Myanmar
- Education: B.Sc (Maths) in 1966 and M.Sc (Maths) in 1990
- Known for: Painter
- Awards: Phillip Morris Myanmar Art Awards, 2001/2002

Kyee Myint Saw (Burmese: ကြီးမြင့်စော; born 1939) is a painter from Myanmar. His paintings invoke the various hues of typical Myanmar colours under the tropical sun.

== Early life ==
Myint Saw was born in 1939 in Yangon, Myanmar. He graduated with B.Sc. (Maths) in 1966 and M.Sc. (Maths) in 1990 at Yangon University .
